Theodorius "Theo" van Halteren (born 15 June 1938 in Deventer) is a Dutch sprint canoeist who competed in the mid-1960s. At the 1964 Summer Olympics in Tokyo, he finished seventh in the K-4 1000 m event.

References
Sports-reference.com profile

1938 births
Living people
Dutch male canoeists
Canoeists at the 1964 Summer Olympics
Olympic canoeists of the Netherlands
Sportspeople from Deventer